The 1998–99 Icelandic Hockey League season was the eighth season of the Icelandic Hockey League, the top level of ice hockey in Iceland. Three teams participated in the league, and Skautafelag Reykjavikur won the championship.

Regular season

Final 
 Skautafélag Akureyrar - Skautafélag Reykjavíkur 0:3 (5:9, 4:7, 5:6)

External links 
 1998-99 season

Icelandic Hockey League
Icelandic Hockey League seasons
1998–99 in Icelandic ice hockey